District Science  Center - Tirunelveli, located in Tirunelveli District  of Tamilnadu State, India. It is operated under National Council of Science Museums, Which is governed by  Ministry of Culture, Indian Government. Which is inaugurated on 19 February 1987.

Location
It is located at the center of Tirunelveli City, its location nearby the 'Thamirabarani River banks' and 'Tirunelveli District Collector Office Cambus' of Kokirakulam.

Features
Now There are four galleries are opened for visitors.
 Fun Science Gallery
 Famous Science Gallery
 Electronics Gallery
 New Wings of Electronics Gallery

Attraction
 TV Studio, 
 Pre Historical Park.
 Mirror Magic Gallery of this centre attracts more people.
 Digital Planetarium of this centre attracts the visitors towards the space wonder.
 Since 1988, This center runs a 'Mobile Science Exhibition' Bus to all over the Tamilnadu, which is spread the science news especially villages of the Tamilnadu.
 Mini 3D Theater : This Theater runs a show of 15 minute to 20 minute length of movie, and show time on 11am, 12Noon and evening 3, 4, 5 pm.  The movie name called as 'Ring of Fire', 'Inner Space', 'Master of Magic', 'Zoo Animal', 'Shark island', 'Dio Island', 'Cat and Mouse'.

Office hour
This center operates from morning 10:30 am to evening 6:30 pm. It runs throughout the year except Deepavali and Pongal festival day.

Fare

See also
 List of planetariums

References

External links
 http://www.dsctirunelveli.org.in/index.php

Museums in Tamil Nadu
Tirunelveli